Si Chomphu is a district (amphoe) of Khon Kaen province, northeastern Thailand.

History
The district was established as a minor district (king amphoe) on 1 July 1965, when three tambons, Si Suk, Si Chomphu, and Na Chan were split from Chum Phae district. It was upgraded to a full district on 1 March 1969.

Geography
Neighboring districts are (from the north clockwise): Si Bun Rueang of Nong Bua Lamphu province; Nong Na Kham, Wiang Kao, and Chum Phae of Khon Kaen Province; and Phu Kradueng of Loei province.

Administration
The district is divided into 10 subdistricts (tambons), which are further subdivided into 107 villages (mubans). Si Chomphu is a township (thesaban tambon) and covers parts of tambon Wang Phoem. There are a further 10 tambon administrative organizations (TAO).

Attractions
Wat Tham Saeng Tham, Tambon Boribun - A large Buddhist temple complex with a cave system inside the mountain. Inside the main cave has a marble floor.  A large building is built on the outside of the mountain and the entrance has a grand gateway.
Wat Pha Nam Thiang, Tambon Boribun - Another Buddhist temple cave which is singular, large and high. There are free roaming monkeys.
Phu Wiang National Park, Wiang Kao, Phu Wiang, Si Chomphu and Chum Phae districts - The Park is noted for its dinosaur excavations.

References

External links
amphoe.com

Si Chomphu